Brawer is a surname. Notable people with the surname include:

 Dina Brawer, first Orthodox woman rabbi in the United Kingdom
 Mara Brawer (born 1962), Argentine psychologist and politician
 Moshe Brawer (1919–2020), Israeli geographer

See also
 Brewer (surname)